The Donna Cardinals were a minor league baseball team based in Donna, Texas. In 1949 and 1950, Donna based teams played exclusively as members of the Rio Grande Valley League. The 1950 Donna-Weslaco Twins played in partnership with neighboring Weslaco, Texas. Donna hosted minor league games at Avila Park.

History
Minor league baseball began in Donna, Texas in 1949. The Donna Cardinals became members of the Class D level Rio Grande Valley League. The Brownsville Charros, Corpus Christi Aces, Del Rio Cowboys, Laredo Apaches and McAllen Giants joined Donna in beginning league play.

After beginning league play on April 27, 1949, Donna relocated during the season. On June 6, 1949, the Cardinals had a 13–25 record when the franchise moved to Robstown, Texas. Finishing the season as the Robstown Cardinals, the Donna/Robstown team finished last in the league standings. With an overall record of 49–93, the team placed 6th playing under managers Russell Frisch, Charlie Engle and Mimi Cavazos, finishing 43.0 games behind the 1st place Corpus Christi Aces. Donna/Robstown finished behind Corpus Christi (89–51), the Laredo Apaches (80–60), Brownsville Charros (75–65), McAllen Giants (70–68) and Del Rio Cowboys (58–80) in the final standings.

The 1950 Donna-Weslaco Twins briefly returned to Rio Grande Valley League play, as the Rio Grande Valley League expanded. The team name reflected the team partnership with neighboring Weslaco, Texas. The 1950 Rio Grande Valley League became a Class C level league, expanding to eight teams, adding the Harlingen Capitals and the Donna-Weslaco team, as Robstown continued play as the Robstown Rebels. On May 4, 1950, Donna-Weslaco had a record of 4–20 when the team permanently folded. G.C. Quin served as manager. The Rio Grande Valley League permanently folded following the 1950 season.

Donna, Texas has not hosted another minor league team.

The ballpark
Both Donna based minor league teams played home games at Avila Park.

Timeline

Year–by–year record

Notable alumni
Vicente Amor (1950)
Charlie Engle (1949, MGR)

References

External links
Baseball Reference
Defunct baseball teams in Texas
Baseball teams established in 1949
Baseball teams disestablished in 1949
Defunct Rio Grande Valley League teams
Hidalgo County, Texas